Killian O'Dwyer is an Irish hurler who plays as a defender for the Tipperary senior team. He plays his club hurling with Killenaule.

Career
O'Dwyer made his senior debut for the Tipperary hurling team on 26 January 2019 in the first round of the 2019 National Hurling League against Clare when he came on as a late substitute.

Honours

Tipperary
All-Ireland Under-21 Hurling Championship (1): 2018
All-Ireland Minor Hurling Championship (1): 2016
Munster Minor Hurling Championship (1): 2016

References

Living people
Killenaule hurlers
Tipperary inter-county hurlers
Year of birth missing (living people)